Daniel Kennard Sadler (October 28, 1882 – April 2, 1960) was an American lawyer and justice on the New Mexico Supreme Court.

Biography
Sadler was born on October 28, 1882, in Paris, Arkansas.  He graduated from the University of Arkansas in 1905, and earned his law degree from Washington and Lee University School of Law.

Sadler married Jessie McGaugh, a native of Gentry, Arkansas, on August 27, 1911; they had two sons: Daniel Jr. and Robert G.

He then practiced law for six years in Dallas, Texas.  He moved to New Mexico in 1915. He practiced law for three years in Santa Fe, and then for eleven years in Raton.

Sadler was first elected to the New Mexico Supreme Court in 1930; it was his first candidacy for public office.  He served as chief justice from 1935 to 1936, from June 1, 1943, to March 15, 1945, from March 28 to December 31, 1946, and again in 1953.

Sadler suffered multiple heart attacks in the 1950s.  He retired May 15, 1959.  His health continued to deteriorate, and he was admitted to St. Vincent Hospital in Santa Fe on March 11, 1960.  His condition steadily worsened, and he died in the hospital the evening of April 2, 1960.

Legacy
At the time of his death, his 28-year tenure was the longest of any justice on the New Mexico Supreme Court during statehood.  He is buried at Fairview Cemetery in Santa Fe.

References

Justices of the New Mexico Supreme Court
New Mexico lawyers
Texas lawyers
University of Arkansas alumni
Washington and Lee University School of Law alumni
People from Paris, Arkansas
Politicians from Santa Fe, New Mexico
People from Raton, New Mexico
1882 births
1960 deaths
Chief Justices of the New Mexico Supreme Court
Burials in New Mexico